La Carbonara is a 2000 Italian historical comedy-drama film written and directed by Luigi Magni.

Plot 
Roman Campagna, early 1800. Cecilia is a commoner who runs an inn, where the specialty is the  "spaghetti alla carbonara". Moreover, the woman is tied to the movement of young patriots, named "Carbonari", who want a united Italy, and are struggling against the power of the pope. Cecilia believes she lost her husband in a fatal accident, and has made a new lover: Fabrizio, who is also a patriot. One day the guy's saved by a monk, when he is about to be imprisoned by the soldiers of Cardinal Rivarola. The monk is the husband of Cecilia, not dead in the accident, and now he helps her to fight against the power of Rome with the Carbonari.

Cast 
Lucrezia Lante della Rovere: Cecilia, la Carbonara
Valerio Mastandrea: Fabrizio 
Nino Manfredi: Cardinal Rivarola
Claudio Amendola: Lupone 
Pierfrancesco Favino: The sergeant 
Fabrizio Gifuni: Zaccaria

References

External links

2000 films
Commedia all'italiana
Films directed by Luigi Magni
Films scored by Nicola Piovani
2000s Italian films